Givisiez railway station is a railway station in the municipality of Givisiez, in the Swiss canton of Fribourg. It is located at the junction of the standard gauge Fribourg–Ins line of Transports publics Fribourgeois and the Fribourg–Yverdon line of Swiss Federal Railways.

The current facility opened on 15 December 2019, replacing a platform to the west. The new station has additional track capacity and a longer platform permitting additional service.

Services
 the following services stop at Givisiez:

 RER Fribourg:
  / :

References

External links 
 
 

Railway stations in the canton of Fribourg
Transports publics Fribourgeois stations
Railway stations in Switzerland opened in 2019